Toomas Turb (born 31 January 1957) is an Estonian athletics competitor.

He was born in Surju, Pärnu County. In 1980 he graduated from Tallinn Pedagogical Institute's Faculty of Physical Education.

He started his sporting exercising in 1969, coached by Ain Koovit. Later his coaches were Rein Rooks and Olav Karikosk. In 1981 he won gold medal at Athletics at the 1981 Summer Universiade – Men's 10,000 metres. He is multiple-times Estonian champion in different running disciplines.

Personal best:
 1500 m: 3.45,3 (1982) 
 5000 m: 13.30,53 (1982)
 10 000 m: 27.54,18 (1981)
 half marathon: 1:04.41 (1992)

References

Living people
1957 births
Estonian male long-distance runners
Estonian male middle-distance runners
Tallinn University alumni
People from Saarde Parish
Universiade medalists in athletics (track and field)
Universiade gold medalists for the Soviet Union
Medalists at the 1981 Summer Universiade